Royal Air Force Bitteswell or more simply RAF Bitteswell is a former Royal Air Force satellite station located  west of Lutterworth, Leicestershire and  north of Rugby, Warwickshire, England.

Construction of the grass airfield at RAF Bitteswell was started in March 1940 and it opened in June 1941. The original grass runways were replaced between February and June 1943 with concrete and asphalt. During WW2 it was used by the RAF for bomber operations and training. During and after WW2 it was also used for aircraft assembly, maintenance, and jet engine development.

History

Second World War
RAF Bitteswell was home to many different units and aircraft, such as No. 1513 (Beam Approach Training) Flight RAF (BAT Flt) flying Airspeed Oxfords from RAF Bramcote, RAF Lindley and Bitteswell between 23 October 1942 and 13 May 1946.

A large number of operational training units (OTU) were based at the airfield. OTU were units which taught flying, navigation and basic Morse code. The difference between OTUs and other training units were that the OTUs performed live missions such as bombing (like the 1,000 Bomber raids), air sea rescue and occasionally mine laying. No.18 Operational Training Unit (OTU) flying the Avro Anson, Fairey Battle and the Vickers Wellington again flying from the main base of RAF Bramcote with Nuneaton (Lindley) and Bitteswell as satellites. The unit was operational from 14 November 1940 and 25 January 1943 and was RAF Bomber Commands Polish training unit.
 
 No. 29 Operational Training Unit RAF (29 OTU), utilising the Vickers Wellington, used Bitteswell as a satellite from their main base at RAF Bruntingthorpe, from 1  June 1943 to 1 November 1944.
 No. 105 (Transport) Operational Training Unit RAF flying the Wellington and the Douglas Dakota from their main base at Bramcote and using Bitteswell as a satellite, between 5 April 1943 and 19 November 1945. The unit became No. 1381 (Transport) Conversion Unit RAF still its main base at Bramcote and using Bitteswell between August and November 1945.
 No. 2735 Squadron RAF Regiment

Post war units
A number of units used the airfield as a satellite to disperse aircraft and for maintenance such as Transport Command Air Crew Examining Unit RAF from RAF Bramcote from December 1945 until August 1946, No. 266 Maintenance Unit RAF between January 1946 and 1947 and No. 20 Service Flying Training School RAF from RAF Church Lawford used Bitteswell as a relief landing ground between July 1946 and May 1947.

Aircraft manufacture

In 1943 a factory was built next to the airfield where Armstrong Whitworth Aircraft assembled aircraft manufactured at Baginton, Coventry. This continued to assemble, test, and maintain aircraft until 1983. In 1947 Armstrong Siddeley established an Experimental Flight Section at Bitteswell for the flight development of jet engines installed in flying test beds. In 1956 the airfield was purchased outright from the Air Ministry.

Aircraft operated

Accidents and incidents

Death of Sidney Cook

Sidney Cook was an aeronautical engineer employed by Armstrong Whitworth Aircraft. On 5 January 1949 he was working on a Meteor which was undergoing ground tests when he was drawn into the port engine. The engine was shut down immediately and he was taken to hospital, but he died the same day.

Death of Hugh Reeves
Hugh Reeves was  a British inventor and engineer. He was involved in a project to reduce noise in jet engines. On 25 October 1955 he was carrying out tests at RAF Bitteswell on a Hawker Hunter Mark V fitted with a Sapphire engine, when he was suddenly drawn into the intake of the silencer and was killed.

Current use

In 1984 the airfield was sold to Doug Arnold to store some of his collection of "Warbirds of Great Britain" classic aircraft, including several Spitfires, a P-51D Mustang, a B-17G Flying Fortress and a Lancaster. It was also used for two Drag Racing meets in 1985. In 1987 it was sold for development as a Distribution Park.

The airfield is now a large business park called Magna Park in which many roads have names relating to aircraft e.g. Wellington Parkway, Buccaneer Way, Hunter Boulevard and Vulcan Way.

References

Citations

Bibliography

External links
 Leicestershire Churches - Bitteswell Church St Mary

Aircraft assembly plants in England
Armstrong Whitworth
Economy of Leicestershire
Harborough District
Hawker Siddeley
Military units and formations established in 1940
Royal Air Force stations in Leicestershire
Royal Air Force stations of World War II in the United Kingdom